Mazurka is a rural locality (a selo) and the administrative center of Mazurskoye Rural Settlement, Povorinsky District, Voronezh Oblast, Russia. The population was 1,577 as of 2010. There are 15 streets.

Geography 
Mazurka is located 30 km northeast of Povorino (the district's administrative centre) by road. Peski is the nearest rural locality.

References 

Rural localities in Povorinsky District